Varanus samarensis, the Samar water monitor, is a species of lizard of   Varanidae family. It is found in the Philippines.

References

Varanus
Reptiles described in 2010
Reptiles of the Philippines